The Aerospool WT9 Dynamic is a Slovak ultralight and light-sport aircraft, designed and produced by Aerospool of Prievidza. The aircraft is supplied as a complete ready-to-fly-aircraft.

Design and development
The aircraft was designed to comply with the Fédération Aéronautique Internationale microlight rules, US light-sport aircraft rules and UK BCAR Section "S". It features a cantilever low-wing, a two-seats-in-side-by-side configuration enclosed cockpit, fixed or retractable tricycle landing gear and a single engine in tractor configuration.

The aircraft is made with carbon fibre sandwich construction. Standard engines available are the  Rotax 912ULS, the Rotax 912iS and the  Rotax 914 four-stroke powerplants. A glider towhook is optional equipment.

The design has been developed into a three to four seat aircraft, the Aerospool WT10 Advantic.

Variants

Microlight version
LSA version
Dynamic Club
EASA Type Certified Model in Restricted airworthiness category to meet Certification Specification CS-LSA, two-seats with fixed landing gear and powered by a Rotax 912 ULS2.

Specifications (WT9 Dynamic European microlight version)

References

External links

Official website

2000s Slovak ultralight aircraft
Light-sport aircraft
Single-engined tractor aircraft
Glider tugs